Márcio da Silva Gomes, aka Marabá (born August 7, 1986 in São Miguel do Guamá, Pará), is a Brazilian footballer who plays for Boa Esporte Clube as a defensive midfielder.

External links
Flapédia profile 

1986 births
Living people
Brazilian footballers
Association football midfielders
Campeonato Brasileiro Série A players
Campeonato Brasileiro Série B players
Paysandu Sport Club players
CR Flamengo footballers
Goytacaz Futebol Clube players
Fortaleza Esporte Clube players
Ipatinga Futebol Clube players
Esporte Clube São José players
Sociedade Esportiva e Recreativa Caxias do Sul players
Sportspeople from Pará